ABC Vancouver is a municipal political party in Vancouver, British Columbia, Canada. It is led by Vancouver businessman and incumbent mayor Ken Sim.

History

Formation 
ABC Vancouver was established by former members of the Non-Partisan Association. (NPA) 
Three of five city councillors elected under the NPA banner in the 2018 Vancouver municipal election – Rebecca Bligh, Lisa Dominato, and Sarah Kirby-Yung – joined ABC Vancouver and ran with the party in the 2022 Vancouver municipal election. The NPA's 2018 mayoral candidate, Ken Sim, was acclaimed as ABC's 2022 mayoral candidate.

The party was founded as "A Better City" by members of the business community associated with the federal Conservatives, the federal Liberals, and the BC Liberals, though the party suggests it attracts members and supporters from across the political spectrum.

Sim and the party's council candidates – Bligh, Dominato, Kirby-Yung, Mike Klassen, Peter Meiszner, Brian Montague and Lenny Zhou – all won election to city council in the 2022 election.

In government 
With the party forming a majority on council, ABC approved several of its key policy planks in the first few council meetings of the 2022-2026 term, including adopting the IHRA definition of antisemitism, green-lighting "urgent measures to uplift Vancouver’s Chinatown," and directing city staff to budget $16 million to hire 100 police officers and 100 mental health nurses.

In early 2023, the party attracted criticism for several policy initiatives. The ABC park board majority voted to remove most of the temporary Stanley Park bike lane and re-establish two car lanes through the park. The ABC-led council approved a 10.7% property tax increase driven by higher costs for city services and maintenance, as well as ABC's promise to bolster the Vancouver Police Department's budget. The council majority also voted to rescind Vancouver's living wage policy, which had applied to contractors and non-union city employees, reducing their minimum wage by over $3 per hour.

Electoral results

References 

Municipal political parties in Vancouver
2021 establishments in British Columbia
Conservative parties in Canada
Political parties established in 2021